Österplana 065 (Öst 65) is an Ordovician fossil meteorite found in the Thorsberg quarry in Sweden on June 26, 2011, and scientifically described in 2016. Measuring 8×6.5×2 cm, it impacted the Earth 470 million years ago, during the Ordovician According to the naming conventions of the Meteoritical Society, the meteorite was named after the locality at which it was found, Österplana.

The meteorite type does not fit into existing meteorite classification. It was preliminarily classified as "winonaite-like". The level of chromium isotope 54Cr in Österplana 065 is similar to those in ordinary chondrites, while oxygen isotopes are similar to those in some rare primitive achondrites. Österplana 065 also features a chromium-spinel–rutile assemblage, not observed in other meteorites.

Österplana 065 is believed to have originated from a larger asteroid, and belongs to a meteorite type that does not presently fall on the Earth.

See also
Ordovician meteor event

References

External links
Entry in Meteoritical Bulletin Database
New ‘Extinct’ Meteorite Hints at Violent Cosmic Collision, NY Times, June 16, 2016

Meteorites found in Sweden
Ordovician Sweden